Lwiindi is an annual festival of the Tonga people of might southern Zambia. It is a thanksgiving ceremony to appease the gods for the good rains and haverst. A number of farm produce are brought for display. The ceremony usually attracts people from around the country and outside. It takes place at a Place called Gonde, near Chief Monze's place in Monze District. The dates for this ceremony is normally, the first weekend of July during the country's Heroes and Unity holidays.

External links

'Chief Monze' - Monze Educational Fund 

Festivals in Zambia
Religious festivals in Zambia
Folk festivals in Zambia
Winter events in Zambia
Winter holidays (Southern Hemisphere)